Mark Collins (born 25 February 1990) is an Irish Gaelic footballer who plays for Premier Senior Championship club Castlehaven and at inter-county level with the Cork senior football team. He currently lines out as a right corner-forward.

Career statistics

Club

Inter-county

Honours

University College Cork
Sigerson Cup (2): 2011, 2013

Castlehaven
Cork Senior Football Championship (2): 2012, 2013

Douglas
Cork Premier Intermediate Hurling Championship (1): 2009

Cork
Munster Senior Football Championship (1): 2012
National Football League Division 1 (1): 2012
McGrath Cup (3): 2014, 2016, 2018
All-Ireland Under-21 Football Championship (1): 2009
Munster Under-21 Football Championship (2): 2009, 2011
Munster Minor Football Championship (1): 2008
Munster Minor Hurling Championship (1): 2008

References

1990 births
Living people
Castlehaven Gaelic footballers
Douglas hurlers
Cork inter-county Gaelic footballers
Cork inter-county hurlers
Munster inter-provincial Gaelic footballers